Works are in the public domain if they are not covered by intellectual property rights (such as copyright) at all, or if the intellectual property rights to the works have expired.

All works first published or released in the United States before January 1, have lost their copyright protection, effective January 1, . In the same manner, works published in  will all be in the public domain as of January 1, and this cycle will repeat until works published in 1977 all become public domain on January 1, 2073. From 2073 works by creators who died seven decades earlier will expire each year. For example, if a creator were to die in 2002, their works’ copyright would last throughout the end of 2072 and enter the public domain on January 1, 2073.

Works that were published without a copyright notice before 1977  are also in the public domain, as are those published before 1989 if the copyright was not registered within five years of the date of publication, and those published before 1964 if the copyright was not renewed 28 years later.

History 

In the United States, copyright at the federal level began with the introduction of the Constitution in 1787. Prior to that several of the individual states had enacted copyright laws, the first being Connecticut in 1783. Creators of works created after the ratification of the Constitution could receive copyright, while works created before the Constitution went into effect remain in the public domain with respect to federal copyright.

Works additionally enter the public domain automatically when copyright has expired, though additional alterations to copyright laws since the original Constitution have extended the length of time for which a given copyright may be valid or can be renewed.

Every work first published prior to 1923 has been in the American public domain since 1998.

The United States Copyright Office is a federal agency tasked with maintaining copyright records.

Public domain works in the U.S.

Public domain literature

Public domain books within the United States include a number of notable titles, many of which are still commonly read and studied as part of the English-language "literary canon". Examples include:

 Notes on the State of Virginia by Thomas Jefferson
 "The Murders in the Rue Morgue" by Edgar Allan Poe
 The Sketch Book of Geoffrey Crayon, Gent. by Washington Irving
 The Scarlet Letter by Nathaniel Hawthorne
 David Copperfield by Charles Dickens
 Moby-Dick by Herman Melville
 Uncle Tom's Cabin by Harriet Beecher Stowe
 The Adventures of Tom Sawyer by Mark Twain
 Mrs Dalloway by Virginia Woolf
 The Invisible Man by H. G. Wells
 Ulysses by James Joyce
 The Great Gatsby by F. Scott Fitzgerald

Public domain images

Thousands of paintings and photographs are under public domain in the USA; these include photographs taken by Jacob Riis, Mathew Brady and Alfred Stieglitz.

Sound recordings under public domain 

Sound recordings fixed in a tangible form before February 15, 1972, have been generally covered by common law or in some cases by anti-piracy statutes enacted in certain states, not by federal copyright law, and the anti-piracy statutes typically have no duration limit. As such, virtually all sound recordings, regardless of age, are presumed to still be under copyright protection in the United States. The 1971 Sound Recordings Act, effective 1972, and the 1976 Copyright Act, effective 1978, provide federal copyright for unpublished and published sound recordings fixed on or after February 15, 1972. Recordings fixed before February 15, 1972, are still covered, to varying degrees, by common law or state statutes. Any rights or remedies under state law for sound recordings fixed before February 15, 1972, are not annulled or limited by the 1976 Copyright Act until February 15, 2067. On that date, all sound recordings fixed before February 15, 1972, will go into the public domain in the United States. The extent to which state statutes provide protection is inconsistent and unclear.

The Music Modernization Act was passed on October 11, 2018. Under this act, recordings published before 1923 expired on January 1, 2022; recordings published between 1923 and 1946 will be protected for 100 years after release; recordings published between 1947 and 1956 will be protected for 110 years; and all recordings published after 1956 that were fixed prior to February 15, 1972, will have their protection terminate on February 15, 2067.

For sound recordings fixed on or after February 15, 1972, the earliest year that any will go out of copyright and into the public domain in the U.S. will be 2043, and not in any substantial number until 2048. Sound recordings fixed and published on or after February 15, 1972, and before 1978, which did not carry a proper copyright notice on the recording or its cover entered the public domain on publication. From 1978 to March 1, 1989, the owners of the copyrights had up to five years to remedy this omission without losing the copyright. Since March 1, 1989, no copyright notice has been required.

Public domain videos

Since the invention of video capture and animation techniques, thousands of films or videos have entered the public domain. Some examples include:

Television series
A number of television series, because they were released before 1964 and did not have their copyright renewed (such as almost all of the extant DuMont Television Network archive), were originally recorded before 1989 without a valid copyright notice, or were works of the United States government, have episodes in the public domain.

Public domain status of television episodes is made complicated by derivative work considerations and disputes over what constitutes "publication" for legal purposes (a network may claim a broadcast telecast once over a network but never syndicated may be an unpublished work); for example, 16 episodes of The Andy Griffith Show are, due to expired copyright, in the public domain by themselves, but in 2007, CBS was able to claim an indirect copyright on the episodes in question by claiming they were derivative works of earlier episodes still under copyright.  Likewise, the 1964 special Rudolph the Red-Nosed Reindeer was published with an invalid copyright notice but uses copious amounts of copyrighted music and is loosely based on an original story that is still under copyright.

Public domain films

Hundreds of American live-action films are in the public domain because they were never copyrighted or because their copyrights have since expired. These movies can be viewed online at websites such as Internet Archive and can also be downloaded from websites like Public Domain Torrents.

Notable examples of such public domain films include:
 Charade (1963)
 Night of the Living Dead (1968)
 The Little Shop of Horrors (1960)

Public domain animated films

Hundreds of American animated films are in the public domain, including:

 Gulliver's Travels (1939 film)
 Popeye the Sailor Meets Sindbad the Sailor
 The Mummy Strikes (featuring Superman)
 Pantry Panic
 Sita Sings the Blues (2008 film)
 Who's Who in the Zoo (1942, part of Looney Tunes series by Warner Bros.)

Public domain in copyrighted works in the United States 
Congress has restored expired copyrights several times: "After World War I and after World War II, there were special amendments to the Copyright Act to permit for a limited time and under certain conditions the recapture of works that might have escaped into the public domain, principally by aliens of countries with which we had been at war." Works published with notice of copyright or registered in unpublished form in the years 1964 through 1977 automatically had their copyrights renewed for a second term. Works published with notice of copyright or registered in unpublished form on or after January 1, 1923, and prior to January 1, 1964, had to be renewed during the 28th year of their first term of copyright to maintain copyright for a full 95-year term. With the exception of maps, music, and movies, the vast majority of works published in the United States before 1964 were never renewed for a second copyright term.

Works "prepared by an officer or employee of the U.S. government as part of that person's official duties" are automatically in the public domain by law. Examples include military journalism, federal court opinions, congressional committee reports, and census data. However, works created by a contractor for the government are still subject to copyright. Even public domain documents may have their availability limited by laws limiting the spread of classified information. This rule does not apply to works of U.S. state & local governments, though the separate edict of government doctrine automatically places all state legislative enactments and court opinions, among other things, in the public domain.

The claim that "pre- works are in the public domain" is correct only for published works; unpublished works are under federal copyright for at least the life of the author plus 70 years. For a work for hire, the copyright in a work created before 1978, but not theretofore in the public domain or registered for copyright, subsists from January 1, 1978, and endures for a term of 95 years from the year of its first publication, or a term of 120 years from the year of its creation, whichever expires first. If the work was created before 1978 but first published 1978–2002, the federal copyright will not expire before 2047.

Until the Berne Convention Implementation Act of 1988, the lack of a proper copyright notice would place an otherwise copyrightable work into the public domain, although for works published between January 1, 1978, and February 28, 1989, this could be prevented by registering the work with the Library of Congress within five years of publication. After March 1, 1989, an author's copyright in a work begins when it is fixed in a tangible form; neither publication nor registration is required, and a lack of a copyright notice does not place the work into the public domain.

On January 1, 2019, published works from 1923 entered the Public Domain under the Copyright Term Extension Act. Works from 1923 that have been identified as entering the public domain in this period include The Murder on the Links, by Agatha Christie; The Great American Novel, by William Carlos Williams; the original silent version of the film The Ten Commandments, by Cecil B. DeMille; the hymn "Great Is Thy Faithfulness"; and the musical London Calling!, by Noël Coward. Whose Body? by Dorothy L. Sayers was published in the U.S. in 1923, but US copyright for this edition expired in 1951, when copyright was not renewed as required in the 28th year.

On January 1, 2020, published works from 1924 entered the public domain. Among the more notable entries into the public domain in 2020 was George Gershwin's "Rhapsody in Blue", a musical work that the Gershwin estate famously fought to keep in copyright.

Since the public domain began expanding annually again in 2019, the month of January has typically seen a large number of public domain works uploaded to sites such as Project Gutenberg, Standard Ebooks, and Wikimedia Commons. Standard Ebooks usually releases a number of notable newly-public domain books each January 1, and films in the public domain are uploaded to Wikimedia Commons (and linked to their corresponding Wikipedia articles) around the same time.

Sound recordings
Very few sound recordings were in the public domain in the United States prior to 2022. Sound recordings fixed in a tangible form before February 15, 1972, have been generally covered by common law or in some cases by anti-piracy statutes enacted in certain states, not by federal copyright law, and the anti-piracy statutes typically have no duration limit. The 1971 Sound Recordings Act, effective 1972, and the 1976 Copyright Act, effective 1978, provide federal copyright for unpublished and published sound recordings fixed on or after February 15, 1972. Recordings fixed before February 15, 1972, are still covered, to varying degrees, by common law or state statutes. Any rights or remedies under state law for sound recordings fixed before February 15, 1972, are not annulled or limited by the 1976 Copyright Act until February 15, 2067. On that date, all sound recordings fixed before February 15, 1972, will go into the public domain in the United States.

For sound recordings fixed on or after February 15, 1972, the earliest year that any will go out of copyright and into the public domain in the U.S. will be 2043, and not in any substantial number until 2048. Sound recordings fixed and published on or after February 15, 1972, and before 1978, which did not carry a proper copyright notice on the recording or its cover entered the public domain on publication. From 1978 to March 1, 1989, the owners of the copyrights had up to five years to remedy this omission without losing the copyright. Since March 1, 1989, no copyright notice has been required.

In September 2018, the US Senate passed the Music Modernization Act, which modified the length of copyright protections for sound recordings and allowed for older sound recordings to enter the public domain prior to the original 15 Feb 2067 expiration date.

Singer, pianist, satirist and mathematician Tom Lehrer placed all of his sound recordings into the public domain in 2022, after having placed the underwriting copyrights to the published and unpublished music into the public domain in 2020.

On January 1, 2022, all sound recordings published before 1923 entered the public domain - the first sound recordings to lose copyright protection in US history. Sound recordings published after 1923 have different copyright terms under the Music Modernization Act, as detailed below:

Note that this only applies to recordings and not lyrics/sheet music. For example, all intellectual property rights relating to the sheet music and lyrics to Rhapsody in Blue expired in 2020, when all written works published in 1924 entered the public domain. The recording itself, however, is protected until January 1, 2025.

Examples

In the United States, the images of Frank Capra's film It's a Wonderful Life (1946) entered into the public domain in 1974, because the copyright holder failed to file a renewal application with the Copyright Office during the 28th year after the film's release or publication. However, in 1993, Republic Pictures utilized the 1990 Supreme Court ruling in Stewart v. Abend to enforce its claim of copyright because the film was a derivative work of a short story that was under a separate, existing copyright, to which Republic owned the film adaptation rights, effectively regaining control of the work in its complete form. Currently, Paramount Pictures owns the film's copyrightable elements.

Charles Chaplin re-edited and scored his 1925 film The Gold Rush for reissue in 1942. Subsequently, the 1925 version fell into the public domain when Chaplin's company failed to renew its copyright in 1953, although the 1942 version is still under US copyright.

The distributor of the cult film Night of the Living Dead, after changing the film's title at the last moment before release in 1968, failed to include a proper copyright notice in the new titles, thereby immediately putting the film into the public domain after its release. This provision of US copyright law was revised with the United States Copyright Act of 1976, which allowed such negligence to be remedied within five years of publication.

A number of TV series in America have lapsed into the public domain, in whole or only in the case of certain episodes, giving rise to wide distribution of some shows on DVD. Series that have only certain episodes in the public domain include Petticoat Junction, The Beverly Hillbillies, The Dick Van Dyke Show, The Andy Griffith Show, The Lucy Show, Bonanza, Annie Oakley, and Decoy.

Laws may make some types of works and inventions ineligible for monopoly; such works immediately enter the public domain upon publication. Many kinds of mental creations, such as publicized baseball statistics, are never covered by copyright. However, any special layout of baseball statistics, or the like, would be covered by copyright law. For example, while a phone book is not covered by copyright law, any special method of laying out the information would be.

Copyright notice

In the past, a work would enter the public domain in the United States if it was released without a copyright notice. This was true prior to March 1, 1989, but is no longer the case. Any work (of certain, enumerated types) now receives copyright as soon as it is fixed in a tangible medium.

Computer Software Rental Amendments Act
There are several references to putting copyrighted work into the public domain. The first reference is actually in a statute passed by Congress, in the Computer Software Rental Amendments Act of 1990 (Public Law 101–650, 104 Stat. 5089 (1990)). Although most of the Act was codified into Title 17 of the United States Code, there is a very interesting provision relating to "public domain shareware" which was not, and is therefore often overlooked.

 Sec. 805. Recordation of Shareware
 (a) IN GENERAL— The Register of Copyrights is authorized, upon receipt of any document designated as pertaining to computer shareware and the fee prescribed by section 708 of title 17, United States Code, to record the document and return it with a certificate of recordation.
 (b) MAINTENANCE OF RECORDS; PUBLICATION OF INFORMATION—The Register of Copyrights is authorized to maintain current, separate records relating to the recordation of documents under subsection (a), and to compile and publish at periodic intervals information relating to such recordations. Such publications shall be offered for sale to the public at prices based on the cost of reproduction and distribution.
 (c) DEPOSIT OF COPIES IN LIBRARY OF CONGRESS—In the case of public domain computer shareware, at the election of the person recording a document under subsection (a), 2 complete copies of the best edition (as defined in section 101 of title 17, United States Code) of the computer shareware as embodied in machine-readable form may be deposited for the benefit of the Machine-Readable Collections Reading Room of the Library of Congress.
 (d) REGULATIONS—The Register of Copyrights is authorized to establish regulations not inconsistent with law for the administration of the functions of the Register under this section. All regulations established by the Register are subject to the approval of the Librarian of Congress.

One purpose of this legislation appears to be to allow "public domain shareware" to be filed at the Library of Congress, presumably so that the shareware would be more widely disseminated. Therefore, one way to release computer software into the public domain might be to make the filing and pay the $20 fee. This could have the effect of "certifying" that the author intended to release the software into the public domain. It does not seem that registration is necessary to release the software into the public domain, because the law does not state that public domain status is conferred by registration. Judicial rulings support this conclusion; see below.

By comparing paragraph (a) and (c), one can see that Congress distinguishes "public domain" shareware as a special kind of shareware. Because this law was passed after the Berne Convention Implementation Act of 1988, Congress was well aware that newly created computer programs (two years worth, since the Berne Act was passed) would automatically have copyright attached. Therefore, one reasonable inference is that Congress intended that authors of shareware would have the power to release their programs into the public domain. This interpretation is followed by the Copyright Office in 37 C.F.R. § 201.26.

Berne Convention Implementation Act
The Berne Convention Implementation Act of 1988 states in section twelve that the Act "does not provide copyright protection for any work that is in the public domain." The congressional committee report explains that this means simply that the Act does not apply retroactively.

Although the only part of the act that does mention "public domain" does not speak to whether authors have the right to dedicate their work to the public domain, the remainder of the committee report does not say that they intended copyright to be an indestructible form of property. Rather the language speaks about getting rid of copyright formalities in order to comply with Berne (non-compliance had become a severe impediment in trade negotiations) and making registration and marking optional, but encouraged. A fair reading is that the Berne Act did not intend to take away author's right to dedicate works to the public domain, which they had (by default) under the 1976 Act.

Section 203 of the Copyright Act
Although there is support in the statutes for allowing work to be dedicated to the public domain, there cannot be an unlimited right to dedicate work to the public domain because of a quirk of U.S. copyright law which grants the author of a work the right to cancel "the exclusive or nonexclusive grant of a transfer or license of copyright or of any right under a copyright" thirty-five years later, unless the work was originally a work for hire.

Case law
Another form of support comes from the case Computer Associates Int'l v. Altai, 982 F.2d 693, which set the standard for determining copyright infringement of computer software. This case discusses the public domain.

 (c) Elements Taken from the Public Domain
 Closely related to the non-protectability of scenes a faire, is material found in the public domain. Such material is free for the taking and cannot be appropriated by a single author even though it is included in a copyrighted work. ... We see no reason to make an exception to this rule for elements of a computer program that have entered the public domain by virtue of freely accessible program exchanges and the like. See 3 Nimmer Section 13.03 [F] ; see also Brown Bag Software, slip op. at 3732 (affirming the district court’s finding that "[p]laintiffs may not claim copyright protection of an ... expression that is, if not standard, then commonplace in the computer software industry."). Thus, a court must also filter out this material from the allegedly infringed program before it makes the final inquiry in its substantial similarity analysis.

This decision holds that computer software may enter the public domain through "freely accessible program exchanges and the like," or by becoming "commonplace in the computer industry." Relying only on this decision, it is unclear whether an author can dedicate his work to the public domain simply by labeling it as such, or whether dedication to the public domain requires widespread dissemination.

This could make a distinction in a CyberPatrol-like case, where a software program is released, leading to litigation, and as part of a settlement the author assigns his copyright. If the author has the power to release his work into the public domain, there would be no way for the new owner to stop the circulation of the program. A court may look on an attempt to abuse the public domain in this way with disfavor, particularly if the program has not been widely disseminated. Either way, a fair reading is that an author may choose to release a computer program to the public domain if he can arrange for it to become popular and widely disseminated.

See also
 2024 in public domain
 Capitol Records, Inc. v. Naxos of America, Inc.
 Copyright status of work by the U.S. government
 Copyright status of works by subnational governments of the United States
 Copyright Term Extension Act
 Eldred v. Ashcroft
 Fair dealing
 Fair use
 List of countries' copyright length
 List of films in the public domain in the United States
 Public Domain Enhancement Act
 Rule of the shorter term
 Uruguay Round Agreements Act

References

External links
 Harvard Library Copyright Advisor - Public domain status of state and local government records (clickable map)

 
Articles containing video clips
United States copyright law